Monroe Township is one of eleven townships in Randolph County, Indiana. As of the 2010 census, its population was 3,711 and it contained 1,609 housing units.

Monroe Township was established before 1851.

Geography

Cities and towns
 Farmland
 Parker City

References

External links
 Indiana Township Association
 United Township Association of Indiana

Townships in Randolph County, Indiana
Townships in Indiana